Wes Benscoter is an American artist who is best known for his work album covers, especially heavy metal albums. He also has made covers for magazines and books, and shirt designs, and his art is featured in many galleries around the world. Most of his work prior to 2006 is done using airbrush. Benscoter lives in Harrisburg, Pennsylvania.

List of works
Autopsy - Macabre Eternal
Black Sabbath - Black Sabbath: The Dio Years
Bloodbath - Nightmares Made Flesh (US-release)
Broken Hope - Loathing
Cattle Decapitation - To Serve Man
Cattle Decapitation - Humanure
Cattle Decapitation - Karma.Bloody.Karma
Cattle Decapitation - The Harvest Floor
Cattle Decapitation - Monolith of Inhumanity
Cattle Decapitation - The Anthropocene Extinction
Cattle Decapitation - Death Atlas
Cephalic Carnage - Exploiting Dysfunction
Crypta - Echoes Of The Soul
Deceased - The Blueprints for Madness
Deceased - Fearless Undead Machines
Defiled - Erupted Wrath
Defiled - Ugliness Revealed
Defiled - Divination
Defiled - In Crisis
Dio - Stand Up and Shout: The Dio Anthology
Embalmer - There Was Blood Everywhere
Exit-13 - ...Just a Few More Hits
Exit-13 - Smoking Songs
Hypocrisy - Osculum Obscenum
Hypocrisy - End of Disclosure
Incantation - Mortal Throne of Nazarene
Kreator - Phantom Antichrist
King's Evil - Deletion of Humanoise
Kittie - Safe
Mortician - Hacked Up for Barbecue
Mortician - Chainsaw Dismemberment
Mortician - Darkest Day of Horror
Mortician - Domain of Death
Mortician - House by the Cemetery
Mortician - Zombie Apocalypse
Nile - Black Seeds of Vengeance
Regurgitate - Carnivorous Erection
Ritual Carnage - The Highest Law
Ritual Carnage - Every Nerve Alive
Sinister - Hate
Sinister - Diabolical Summoning
Slayer - Divine Intervention
Slayer - Undisputed Attitude
Slayer - Live Intrusion
Solace - Further
Torture Killer - Swarm!
Torture Killer - Sewers
Vader - De Profundis
Vader - Solitude in Madness
Vehemence - Helping the World to See

External links

Living people
American illustrators
Album-cover and concert-poster artists
Year of birth missing (living people)